M'Sendo Minu Kololo (born 3 July 1990) is a Congolese footballer who plays as goalkeeper.

References

External links
 

Living people
1990 births
Republic of the Congo footballers
Association football goalkeepers
First Professional Football League (Bulgaria) players
FC Montana players
Liga II players
CS Sportul Snagov players
Republic of the Congo expatriate footballers
Republic of the Congo expatriate sportspeople in Bulgaria
Expatriate footballers in Bulgaria
Republic of the Congo expatriate sportspeople in Romania
Expatriate footballers in Romania